Tim Payne may refer to:

Tim Payne (footballer) (born 1994), New Zealand footballer
Tim Payne (musician), musician with Thursday
Tim Payne (rugby union) (born 1979), rugby player

See also
Tim Paine (born 1984), Australian cricketer